Boyd Tavern, also known as Old Boyd Tavern, Watson's Ordinary, and Shepherd's Inn, is a historic tavern located in Boyd Tavern, Albemarle County, Virginia.  It was built about 1831, and is a two-story, two-over-two, three-bay double-pile frame structure.  It sits on a fieldstone foundation and has a side-gable roof.  A one-story addition was built in the early 20th century.  The property includes a family cemetery used by the Shepherds, owners of the property from the mid-1800s to 1937.  The building housed a tavern, store, and post office at various times until 1937, when it became a single-family dwelling.  The house was renovated in 1978.

It was added to the National Register of Historic Places in 2009.

References

Buildings and structures in Albemarle County, Virginia
Taverns in Virginia
Drinking establishments on the National Register of Historic Places in Virginia
Commercial buildings completed in 1831
National Register of Historic Places in Albemarle County, Virginia